Irene Schouten (born 21 June 1992) is a Dutch speed skater who competes in allround marathon and inline-skating events. She is a five-time Olympic medalist and a triple Olympic Champion, having won the 3,000m, 5,000m, and mass start events at the 2022 Beijing Games. As of 12 February 2022, she holds the Olympic record in both distances (3000m & 5000m). Her coach is Jillert Anema.

On 2 March 2014, Schouten finished in third place at the 2014 Dutch Allround Championships and qualified for the 2014 World Allround Championships in Thialf, Heerenveen. At the 2018 Winter Olympic Games she won the bronze medal in the mass start event.

At the 2022 Winter Olympic Games, Schouten became the most successful  Dutch Olympic athlete of the event by winning four medals, including three gold. In comparison: Schouten would have ranked 13th in the overall medal ranking by country, by herself, outscoring the entire athlete delegations of notable winterport nations like Italy and South Korea. 
Schouten is the current Olympic and Dutch record holder in the 5000 metres.

Records

Personal records

Schouten occupies the 3rd position on the Adelskalender with a score of 155.779 points.

Olympic records

Tournament overview

Source:

World Cup overview

Source:
 DNQ = Did not qualify
 DQ = Disqualified
 – = Did not participate
(b) = Division B

References

External links
 
 
 
 

1992 births
Dutch female speed skaters
People from Andijk
Living people
Speed skaters at the 2018 Winter Olympics
Speed skaters at the 2022 Winter Olympics
Olympic speed skaters of the Netherlands
Medalists at the 2018 Winter Olympics
Medalists at the 2022 Winter Olympics
Olympic medalists in speed skating
Olympic gold medalists for the Netherlands
Olympic bronze medalists for the Netherlands
World Single Distances Speed Skating Championships medalists
World Allround Speed Skating Championships medalists
Sportspeople from North Holland
21st-century Dutch women
20th-century Dutch women
20th-century Dutch people